Dimitar Nikolaev Popov (born 27 February 1970) is a former Bulgarian professional footballer who played as a goalkeeper.

Career
In his career Popov played for Levski Sofia, Botev Plovdiv, Spartak Plovdiv, CSKA Sofia, Maritsa Plovdiv, Lokomotiv Sofia, Spartak Varna and El Paso Patriots. For the Bulgaria national football team, he participated at Euro 1996.  Popov had 14 caps for the Bulgaria national football team in the period 1993-1997.  In April 2000, he signed with the El Paso Patriots of the USISL.

References

1970 births
Living people
Bulgarian footballers
Association football goalkeepers
PFC Levski Sofia players
Botev Plovdiv players
FC Spartak Plovdiv players
PFC CSKA Sofia players
FC Maritsa Plovdiv players
FC Lokomotiv 1929 Sofia players
PFC Spartak Varna players
El Paso Patriots players
UEFA Euro 1996 players
First Professional Football League (Bulgaria) players
Bulgaria international footballers
Bulgarian expatriate footballers
USL League Two players
A-League (1995–2004) players
Bulgarian emigrants to the United States